Shadows is a series of paintings by the American artist Andy Warhol.

The paintings were executed between 1978-79 and purchased as a single group by the Dia Art Foundation.  The series on "long term view" at the foundation's Dia Beacon museum in Beacon, New York.

References

1979 paintings
Paintings by Andy Warhol
Painting series
Unfinished paintings